Pinnock is a surname. Notable people with the surname include:
Andrew Pinnock (born 1980), American football player
Anna Pinnock, set decorator
Arnold Pinnock, Canadian actor
Chris Pinnock (born 1979), Jamaican hurdler
Clark Pinnock (born 1937), Canadian theologian
Danielle Pinnock (born 1988), American actress
Ethan Pinnock (born 1993), Jamaican footballer
Hugh W. Pinnock (1934–2000), Latter-day Saint leader
Kath Pinnock (born 1946), British politician
James Pinnock (born 1978), English footballer
Jason Pinnock (born 1999), American football player
J. R. Pinnock (born 1983), American basketball player
Leigh-Anne Pinnock (born 1991), British singer with Little Mix
Pam Pinnock (born 1973), American author and publicist
Sherene Pinnock (born 1987), Jamaican hurdler
Thomas G. Pinnock (?–1914), Massachusetts politician
Trevor Pinnock (born 1946), English harpsichordist and conductor
William Pinnock (1782–1843), British publisher
Winsome Pinnock (born 1961), British playwright

See also
Penix, a surname
Pinnick, a surname
St Pinnock, Cornwall